China Books, Inc. (formerly known as China Books & Periodicals, Inc.) is the oldest distributor of books, periodicals, and other media and educational products from China in the United States. It is a wholesale and retail distributor of books published and printed in China, and also publishes and distributes books in the U.S. under its own imprint.

China Books was founded in Chicago in 1960 by Dr. Henry Halsey Noyes (1910–2004).  Noyes was born in Guangzhou, China into a third generation Presbyterian missionary family. Noyes’ single-minded determination to distribute "highly sensitive" material from the PRC during the Cold War shocked Americans, who, at the time, knew very little about the PRC. Since 1969, China Books has sold over a million copies of the Little Red Book or Quotations from Chairman Mao Zedong. At its peak before the 1989 Tiananmen Square protests and massacre, China Books thrived with stores in San Francisco, Chicago, and New York and employed over 50 people. China Books was instrumental in providing books, newspapers, and magazines from China which were essential to the establishing of post-1949 Chinese political and reference materials at university and other research libraries across the United States. 

In 2002, China Books was jointly acquired by Sino United Publishing (Holdings) Ltd. Hong Kong and the China International Publishing Group Beijing. As of 2012, China Books, together with Long River Press became part of Sinomedia International Group. Its offices are located in South San Francisco, California.

References and external links 
 Official website
 Publishers Weekly. China Takes Over China Books: The Longer Story  — Published November 10, 2003. This article is about the history of China Books and the sale of the company to Sino United Publishing and China International Publishing Group.
 Publishers Weekly."Looking for China's Murakami"  — Published September 24, 2007. This article is about the potential market of books from China
 Publishers Weekly.Digging to China  — Published October 16, 2007. This article is about the cultural differences between Chinese and American publishers. Note:

Publishing companies established in 1960
Book publishing companies based in the San Francisco Bay Area
Companies based in San Mateo County, California